Miniphasma is a genus of phasmid or stick insect of the family Diapheromeridae. Two species are recognized, both endemic to Sri Lanka.

Species
Miniphasma prima
Miniphasma secunda

References

Phasmatodea
Phasmatodea genera
Insects of Asia
Insects described in 2007